The 1971 Nice International Championships, was a men's tennis tournament played on outdoor clay courts at the Nice Lawn Tennis Club in Nice, France that was part of Group D of the 1971 Grand Prix circuit. It was the inaugural edition of the tournament and was held from 29 March until 4 April 1971. Ilie Năstase won the title.

Finals

Singles
 Ilie Năstase defeated  Jan Kodeš 10–8, 11–9, 6–1
 It was Năstase's 3rd singles title of the year and the 5th of his career.

Doubles
 Ilie Năstase /  Ion Țiriac defeated  Pierre Barthès /  François Jauffret 6–3, 6–3

References

External links
 ITF tournament edition details

Nice International Open
1971
Nice International Open
Nice International Open
Nice International Open
20th century in Nice